Sydney-Lang was an electoral district of the Legislative Assembly in the Australian state of New South Wales, created in 1894 from part of the electoral district of West Sydney in inner Sydney and named after Presbyterian clergyman, writer, politician and activist John Dunmore Lang. It was west of George Street, generally south of Margaret Street, north of Hay Street and east of Darling Harbour. It was abolished in 1904 and absorbed into Darling Harbour.

Future Prime Minister of Australia Billy Hughes was the member for Sydney-Lang from 1894 to 1901, when he resigned to enter the newly established Federal parliament.

Members for Sydney-Lang

Election results

References

Former electoral districts of New South Wales
Constituencies established in 1894
1894 establishments in Australia
Constituencies disestablished in 1904
1904 disestablishments in Australia